The Prix Victor-Rossel is a literary award in Belgium that was first awarded in 1938. The award was created by three people associated with the newspaper Le Soir: the owner Marie-Thérèse Rossel, the manager Lucien Fuss and the editor-in-chief, Charles Breisdorff.

The name commemorates Victor Rossel, the son of Emile Rossel, the paper's founder. The prize was not awarded from 1940 to 1945 during the German occupation of Belgium.

List of Winners 
 1938 – Marguerite Guyaux, Bollèche
 1939 – Madeleine Ley, Le Grand Feu
 1946 – Max Defleur, Le Ranchaud
 1947 – Maurice Carême, Contes pour Caprine 
 1948 – Nelly Kristink, Le Renard à l'anneau d'or 
 1949 – Jean Welle, Le bonheur est pour demain... 
 1950 – André Villers, La Griffe du léopard 
 1951 – Daniel Gillès, Mort la douce
 1952 – Albert Ayguesparse, Notre ombre nous précède
 1953 – Paul-Aloïse De Bock, Terres basses 
 1954 – Jacqueline de Boulle, Le Desperado 
 1955 – Lucien Marchal, La Chute du grand Chimu 
 1956 – Stanislas d'Otremont, L'Amour déraisonnable 
 1957 – Edmond Kinds, Les Ornières de l'été 
 1958 – Stéphane Jourat, Entends, ma chère, entends 
 1959 – Jacqueline Harpman, Brève Arcadie 
 1960 – Victor Misrahi, Les Routes du Nord 
 1961 – David Scheinert, Le Flamand aux longues oreilles 
 1962 – Maud Frère, Les Jumeaux millénaires 
 1963 – Charles Bertin, Le Bel Âge 
 1964 – Louis Dubrau, À la poursuite de Sandra 
 1965 – Jacques Henrard, L'Écluse de novembre 
 1966 – Eugénie De Keyser, La Surface de l'eau 
 1967 – Marie Denis, L'Odeur du père 
 1968 – Charles Paron, Les vagues peuvent mourir 
 1969 – Franz Weyergans, L'Opération 
 1970 – Pierre Mertens, L'Inde ou l'Amérique 
 1971 – Renée Brock, L'Étranger intime 
 1972 – Irène Stecyk, Une petite femme aux yeux bleus 
 1973 – Georges Thinès, Le Tramway des officiers 
 1974 – André-Marcel Adamek, Le Fusil à pétales 
 1975 – Sophie Deroisin, Les Dames 
 1976 – Gabriel Deblander, L'Oiseau sous la chemise 
 1977 – Vera Feyder, La Derelitta 
 1978 – Gaston Compère, Portrait d'un roi dépossédé 
 1979 – Jean Muno, Histoires singulières 
 1980 – Jacques Crickillon, Supra-Coronada 
 1981 – François Weyergans, Macaire le Copte 
 1982 – Raymond Ceuppens, L'Été pourri 
 1983 – Guy Vaes, L'Envers 
 1984 – Jean-Pierre Hubin, En lisière 
 1985 – Thierry Haumont, Le Conservateur des ombres 
 1986 – Jean-Claude Pirotte, Un été dans la combe 
 1987 – René Swennen, Les Trois Frères 
 1988 – Michel Lambert, Une vie d'oiseau 
 1989 – , La Faute des femmes 
 1990 – Philippe Blasband, De cendres et de fumées 
 1991 – Anne François, Nu-Tête
 1992 – Jean-Luc Outers, Corps de métier 
 1993 – Nicole Malinconi, Nous deux 
 1994 – Alain Bosquet de Thoran, La Petite Place à côté du théâtre  
 1995 – Patrick Roegiers, Hémisphère nord 
 1996 – Caroline Lamarche, Le Jour du chien
 1997 – Henry Bauchau, Antigone ; Jean-Philippe Toussaint, La Télévision 
 1998 – François Emmanuel, La Passion Savinsen 
 1999 – Daniel De Bruycker, Silex. La tombe du chasseur 
 2000 – Laurent de Graeve, Le Mauvais Genre 
 2001 – Thomas Gunzig, Mort d'un parfait bilingue 
 2002 – Xavier Deutsch, La Belle Étoile
 2003 – Ariane Le Fort, Beau-fils 
 2004 – Isabelle Spaak, Ça ne se fait pas 
 2005 – Patrick Delperdange, Chants des gorges 
 2006 – Guy Goffette, Une enfance lingère 
 2007 – Diane Meur, Les Vivants et les Ombres 
 2008 – Bernard Quiriny, Contes carnivores 
 2009 – Serge Delaive, Argentine 
 2010 – Caroline De Mulder, Ego Tango
 2011 – Geneviève Damas, Si tu passes la rivière
 2012 – Patrick Declerck, Démons me turlupinant
 2013 - Alain Berenboom, Monsieur Optimiste
 2014 - Hedwige Jeanmart, Blanès
 2015 - Eugène Savitzkaya, Fraudeur
 2016 - Hubert Antoine, Danse de la vie brève
 2017 - Laurent Demoulin, Robinson
 2018 – Adeline Dieudonné, La Vraie Vie
 2019 – Vinciane Moeschler, Trois incendies
 2020 – Catherine Barreau, La Confiture de morts

References

External links 
 

Belgian literary awards
Awards established in 1938